Artyom Anatolyevich Kulikov (born 31 January 1980) is a Russian football manager and a former player. He is the manager of FC Veles Moscow.

Coaching career
On 31 October 2019 he was appointed head coach of FC Krasnodar-2 in the Russian Football National League.

On 29 May 2021, he was hired by FC Veles Moscow. He left Veles by mutual consent on 29 November 2021.

On 6 December 2021, he signed with FC Rotor Volgograd.

References

External links
 

1980 births
Sportspeople from Astrakhan
Living people
Russian footballers
Association football forwards
FC Volgar Astrakhan players
FC Oryol players
FC KAMAZ Naberezhnye Chelny players
FC Volga Nizhny Novgorod players
FC Krasnodar players
Russian First League players
Russian Second League players
Russian football managers
FC Rotor Volgograd managers
FC Saturn Ramenskoye managers